Thiopurine methyltransferase or thiopurine S-methyltransferase (TPMT) is an enzyme that in humans is encoded by the TPMT gene.  A pseudogene for this locus is located on chromosome 18q.

Function 

Thiopurine methyltransferase methylates thiopurine compounds. The methyl donor is S-adenosyl-L-methionine, which is converted to S-adenosyl-L-homocysteine. This enzyme metabolizes thiopurine drugs via S-adenosyl-L-methionine as the S-methyl donor and S-adenosyl-L-homocysteine as a byproduct.

Clinical significance 

Thiopurine drugs such as 6-mercaptopurine are used as chemotherapeutic agents and immunosuppressive drugs. Genetic polymorphisms that affect this enzymatic activity are correlated with variations in sensitivity and toxicity to such drugs within individuals. About 1/300 individual is deficient for the enzyme.

Pharmacology 

TPMT is best known for its role in the metabolism of the thiopurine drugs such as azathioprine, 6-mercaptopurine and 6-thioguanine.  TPMT catalyzes the S-methylation of thiopurine drugs. Defects in the TPMT gene leads to decreased methylation and decreased inactivation of 6MP leading to enhanced bone marrow toxicity which may cause myelosuppression, anemia, bleeding tendency, leukopenia & infection. Allopurinol inhibits thiopurine S-methyltransferase, which can increase the utility of 6-MP.

Diagnostic use
Measurement of TPMT activity is encouraged prior to commencing the treatment of patients with thiopurine drugs such as azathioprine, 6-mercaptopurine and 6-thioguanine. Patients with low activity (10% prevalence) or especially absent activity (prevalence 0.3%) are at a heightened risk of drug-induced bone marrow toxicity due to accumulation of the unmetabolised drug. Reuther et al. found that about 5% of all thiopurine therapies will fail due to toxicity. This intolerant group could be anticipated by routine measurement of TPMT activity.  There appears to be a great deal of variation in TPMT mutation, with ethnic differences in mutation types accounting for variable responses to 6MP.

Genetic variants of TPMT have also been associated with cisplatin-induced ototoxicity in children. TPMT is now listed as a pharmacogenomic biomarker for adverse drug reactions to cisplatin by the FDA.

See also 

 Cancer pharmacogenomics

References

Further reading

.

External links
 City Assays page on the TPMT assay
 

EC 2.1.1